Pierre Chappuis (6 January 1930 – 22 December 2020) was a Swiss writer, poet, and literary critic.

Biography
Chappuis was born on 6 January 1930 in Tavannes, where his father was a clockmaker. After studying in La-Chaux-de-Fonds and the University of Geneva, he began teaching French and history in Neuchâtel. He then lived there for the rest of his life.

For a long time, Chappuis wrote poetry in the shadows. He combined his texts with engravings or photographs from third-party illustrators. He also worked as a literary critic for various newspapers, including the Gazette de Lausanne, the Nouvelle Revue Française, and La Quinzaine littéraire. Throughout his career, he closely kept his links with Romandy despite the large amount of works published in Paris.

Pierre Chappuis died in Neuchâtel on 22 December 2020 at the age of 90.

Works

Distinctions
Prize of the Société jurassienne d'émulation (1975)
Prix Suisse-Canada (1983)
Prize of the Institut neuchâtelois (1997)
Schiller Prize (1997)
Prize of the Canton of Bern (2002)
Grand Prix C. F. Ramuz (2005)

References

1930 births
2020 deaths
Swiss writers